The Bank Employees' Union is the name of:

Bank Employees' Union (Finland), a former trade union
Bank Employees' Union (Trinidad and Tobago), a former trade union
Botswana Bank Employees' Union, a trade union
 Australian Bank Employees' Union or ABEU, now part of the Finance Sector Union